Cactus virus X (CVX) is a plant pathogenic virus of the family Alphaflexiviridae.

External links
ICTVdB - The Universal Virus Database: Cactus virus X
Family Groups - The Baltimore Method

Viral plant pathogens and diseases
Cacti
Potexviruses